General Secretary of the Central Committee of the Lao People's Revolutionary Party is the office of the highest-ranking member of the Lao People's Revolutionary Party (LPRP). Since the party's takeover in 1975, its leader has been the supreme leader of Laos.  The General Secretary is also the Chairman of the Defense and Public Security Commission, the commander-in-chief of the Lao People's Armed Forces. From 1991 to 2006, the office was titled Chairman of the Central Committee of the Lao People's Revolutionary Party. The Party's Central Committee elects the General Secretary. The General Secretary usually also becomes President of Laos eventually, though from 1975 to 1991 and from 1992 to 1998 he was usually Prime Minister.

Officeholders

Notes

References

Lao People's Revolutionary Party